The 1985 Canada rugby union tour of Australia was a series of matches played between May and June 1985 in Australia by the Canada national rugby union team.

Results 

Scores and results list Canada's points tally first.

Canada
Canada national rugby union team tours
Tour
Rugby union tours of Australia